The Cross for the Four Day Marches is a Dutch Royal decoration awarded for successful participation in the International Four Days Marches Nijmegen (Vierdaagse in Dutch) held annually at Nijmegen, The Netherlands.

History
The cross was established in 1909 at the time of the first march, to award successful military participants of the Vierdaagse. Since 1910 it has been awarded to all participants who successfully complete all four days, both military and civilian. Beginning in 2009 wheelchair users who complete the course have been eligible for the cross.

The Cross is awarded by the Royal Dutch Walking League (KWBN or ) who organise the Nijmegen Marches. Prior to 2015 the League was known as the Royal Dutch League for Physical Education (KNBLO or Koninklijke Nederlandsche Bond Voor Lichamelijke Opvoeding) and before 1959, when it received the Royal (Koninklijke) prefix, as the NBVLO.

As well as the Vierdaagse at Nijmegen, the cross was also awarded to those who completed the four day marches organised in various locations in the Dutch East Indies between 1935 and 1939.

Normally all four days of the march have to be completed to earn the Cross. However in 2022, when the first day was cancelled due to the predicted extreme heat, the medal was awarded to all those who completed the final three days.

Wear on military uniforms
Although it is awarded by a non-governmental organisation, the Cross has received Royal approval and can be worn on the uniforms of the Armed forces of the Netherlands and other Dutch uniformed services, including the police, fire brigade and customs services. It is therefore an official decoration within the Kingdom of the Netherlands.

This government recognition has extended over the years. Authority to wear in uniform was first granted on 26 October 1909 by Queen Wilhelmina in a Royal Decree to wear to infantry soldiers below officer rank. Other soldiers could accept the decoration, but not wear it. As the March established itself, this authority widened with, for example, sailors of the Royal Netherlands Navy were granted permission to wear in 1919 and army and naval officers from 1928.

A number of other nations currently permit the Vierdaagse cross to be worn in military uniform. These include: Denmark, France, Germany, Norway, Sweden (since 1977), South Africa and the USA. According to (United States) Army Regulation 600-8-22, Appendix E, the Cross is listed as "Holland Four Day Event Cross" as being authorised for wear in uniform. Countries that do not allow the medal to be worn include Canada, Ireland, Israel and the United Kingdom.

Design
The decoration is a five-armed cross, with each arm bearing an initial of the awarding organisation. It has a width of 36 mm at its widest point and is suspended from a green-and-yellow (often orange-yellow) ribbon. Until 1958 the initials on the five arms read: ‘NBVLO’, with ‘KNBLO’ since 1959 to reflect the Koninklijke (Royal) prefix. There have been other minor changes in design over the years. For example, in 1977 the previous silver gilt and silver crosses were replaced by base metal versions, with other design modifications in order to reduce costs.

The reverse is plain except for the name of the manufacturer.

All medals were made by Koninklijke Begeer of the South Holland town of Voorschoten until 1976, when the contract moved to W. van Veluw of Zeist, near Utrecht.

Award structure
Every year a walker successfully completes the march is marked either by a special cross, or a number to be attached to the ribbon of the last cross awarded. A cross is awarded in bronze for the first march, silver for the fifth and gold for the tenth, with a crown added above the cross for the year after each cross is awarded. Appropriate numbers are pinned on the ribbon for intervening years. In recent years further distinct crosses, with crown, have been added for a walker’s fortieth, fiftieth, sixtieth and seventieth successful march. To date the highest ribbon number awarded is 71 to Bert van der Lans, aged 86, in 2018. Annie Berkhout completed her 66th march in 2002 and is the female record holder.

Only one cross, the last one awarded, is worn. For ribbon numbers, only the number most recently received should be worn.

Numbers awarded
Between 1909 and 2022, about 659,800 walkers successfully completed the march 1,729,757 times. Therefore, approximately 659,800 first year crosses have been awarded, with nearly 1,070,000 further awards, including second year crowns, silver and gold crosses and ribbon numbers. Of the awards for the highest number of marches, approximately 805 walkers have been awarded the cross for forty years, about 187 for fifty years and eleven for sixty years. The cross for seventy years has been awarded only twice, to Bert van der Lans in 2017 and to Dick Koopman in 2019.

Related awards
 Group Medal of the Four Day Marches
 Orderly Medal of the Four Day Marches

References

Further reading
 W.F. Bax, Ridderorden, eereteekenen, draagteekens en penningen, betreffende de Weermacht van Nederland en Koloniën (1813-heden), 1973. 
 H.G. Meijer, C.P. Mulder en B.W. Wagenaar, Orders and Decorations of the Netherlands, 1984
 H.G. Meijer en B.W. Wagenaar, Onderscheidingen, Eretekens en Sportprijzen voor Vaardigheid, 2000. 
 R.G. Pearson, Medals of the Nijmegen Marches, Orders & Medals Research Society Journal. Vol 49, No 3, p 190–2. Sept 2010
 De Wereld Wandelt, KNBLO, 1991. 
 50 Jaar Vereniging Gouden Kruisdragers Vierdaagse 1951 – 2001, KNBLO, 1993.

External links

 Medals of the Nijmegen Vierdaagse
 Dutch Orders and Decorations, Four Day Cross 
 A note on the medal on the official Vierdaagse website

Cross
Four Days